Aphyle is a genus of moths in the family Erebidae. The genus was erected by Francis Walker in 1855.

Species
Aphyle affinis
Aphyle cuneata
Aphyle flavicolor
Aphyle margaritaceus
Aphyle onorei
Aphyle steinbachi

References

Phaegopterina
Moth genera